Arnaud de Castelbajac (4 May 1871 – 5 November 1949) was a French sports shooter. He competed in the 25 m rapid fire pistol event at the 1924 Summer Olympics.

References

External links
 

1871 births
1949 deaths
French male sport shooters
Olympic shooters of France
Shooters at the 1924 Summer Olympics
Place of birth missing